The Episcopal Diocese of Litoral Ecuador is a missionary church of the Anglican Communion for the coastal region of Ecuador with headquarters in Guayaquil.  It forms part of Province IX of the Episcopal Church.  The third and current bishop is Cristobal Olmedo Leon Lozano.

Bishops
 Luis Caisapanta (1988-1991) * Martiniano García Montiel (1992-1994) (Administrator)
 Alfredo Terencio Morante España (1994-2019)
 Cristobal Leon Lozano (2019-Present)

Anglicanism in South America
Protestantism in Ecuador
Litoral Ecuador
Religious organisations based in Ecuador
Province 9 of the Episcopal Church (United States)